Louise Archambault is a Canadian film director and screenwriter. She is best known for her films Familia, which won the Claude Jutra Award in 2005, and Gabrielle, which won the Canadian Screen Award for Best Picture in 2014.

She has directed numerous short films, including Atomic Saké, Lock, Petite Mort and Kluane. Her film Gabrielle was screened in the Special Presentation section at the 2013 Toronto International Film Festival, and won two Canadian Screen Awards at the 2nd Canadian Screen Awards, for Best Picture and Best Actress for star Gabrielle Marion-Rivard.

Her third feature film And the Birds Rained Down, an adaptation of Jocelyne Saucier's novel Il pleuvait des oiseaux, was released in 2019. Her fourth film, Thanks for Everything (Merci pour tout), followed later the same year.

She is a graduate of Concordia University in Montreal (BFA 93, MFA 00).

References

External links

Film directors from Montreal
Writers from Montreal
Living people
Canadian screenwriters in French
Canadian women film directors
Best First Feature Genie and Canadian Screen Award winners
Concordia University alumni
Canadian women screenwriters
Year of birth missing (living people)
20th-century Canadian screenwriters
20th-century Canadian women writers
21st-century Canadian screenwriters
21st-century Canadian women writers
Best Director Jutra and Iris Award winners